Gasponia gaurani is a species of beetle in the family Cerambycidae. It was described by Fairmaire in 1892. It is known from Ethiopia, Djibouti, Somalia, Kenya, and Tanzania.

References

Crossotini
Beetles described in 1892